This is a list of Belgian television related events from 2008.

Events
9 March - Ishtar are selected to represent Belgium at the 2008 Eurovision Song Contest with their song "O Julissi". They are selected to be the fiftieth Belgian Eurovision entry during Eurosong held at the VRT Studios in Schelle.
4 June - Sara actor Antony Arandia and his partner Leila Akcelik win the third season of Sterren op de Dansvloer.
17 December - Dirk De Smet wins the second and final season of X Factor.

Debuts

Television shows

1990s
Samson en Gert (1990–present)
Familie (1991–present)
Thuis (1995–present)

2000s
Idool (2003-2011)
Mega Mindy (2006–present)
Sterren op de Dansvloer (2006–2013)

Ending this year
Wittekerke (1993-2008)
X Factor (2005-2008)

Births

Deaths

See also
2008 in Belgium